Ordinatio sacerdotalis is an apostolic constitution issued by Pope John Paul II on 22 May 1994 in which he discussed the Catholic Church's position requiring "the reservation of priestly ordination to men alone" and wrote that "the Church has no authority whatsoever to confer priestly ordination on women". While the document states that it was written so "that all doubt may be removed regarding a matter of great importance", it has been contested by some Catholics, as to both the substance and in the authoritative nature of its teaching.

Content

Citing an earlier Vatican document, Inter insigniores, "on the question of the Admission of women to the Ministerial Priesthood", issued by the Congregation for the Doctrine of the Faith in October 1976, Pope John Paul explains the official Roman Catholic understanding that the priesthood is a special role specially set out by Jesus when he chose twelve men out of his group of male and female followers. Pope John Paul notes that Jesus chose the Twelve after a night in prayer (cf. Lk 6:12) and that the Apostles themselves were careful in the choice of their successors. The priesthood is "specifically and intimately associated in the mission of the Incarnate Word himself."

The letter concludes with the words:

Magisterial weight

The phrase "definitively held by all the Church's faithful" pertains to the full assent of faith that is given to the dogmas of the Catholic Church. Nevertheless, multiple theologians argue that Ordinatio sacerdotalis was not issued under the extraordinary papal magisterium as an ex cathedra statement, and so is not considered infallible in itself.

In a responsum ad dubium (reply to a doubt) explicitly approved by Pope John Paul II and dated October 1995, the Congregation for the Doctrine of the Faith replied that the teaching of Ordinatio sacerdotalis had been "set forth infallibly by the ordinary and universal Magisterium" and accordingly was "to be held definitively, as belonging to the deposit of faith".

The Catholic Theological Society of America issued a report in 1997, approved by 216 out of 248 of its voting members, stating that "There are serious doubts regarding the nature of the authority of this teaching and grounds in Tradition."

In 1998, the Congregation for the Doctrine of the Faith issued another opinion, a Doctrinal Commentary on Ad tuendam fidem, which said that the teaching of Ordinatio sacerdotalis was not taught as being divinely revealed , although it might someday be so taught in the future, that is to say, it has not been determined whether the doctrine is "to be considered an intrinsic part of revelation or only a logical consequence", yet in either case it is certainly definitive and to be believed infallibly.

See also 
 Dogma (Roman Catholic)
 Sacerdotalism
 Ordination of women and the Catholic Church

Notes

References

External links 
Ordinatio Sacerdotalis — complete English text from the Vatican
1995 Responsum ad dubium from the Congregation for the Doctrine of the Faith, with a cover letter from Joseph Cardinal Ratzinger

Further reading 

EWTN Article About the Infallibility of Ordinatio Sacerdotalis
Article Asserting that Ordinatio Sacerdotalis is Ex Cathedra Infallible

1994 in Christianity
1994 documents
Ordination of women and the Catholic Church
Documents of Pope John Paul II